Fischeria  is a plant genus in the family Apocynaceae, first described as a genus in 1813. It is native to South America, Central America, southern Mexico, and the West Indies.

Species

formerly included

References

External links

Asclepiadoideae
Apocynaceae genera